Stephen G. Grubb (October 4, 1834 – July 30, 1908) was an American politician in the state of Washington. He served in the Washington House of Representatives from 1889 to 1891.

References

Republican Party members of the Washington House of Representatives
1834 births
1908 deaths
19th-century American politicians